Treechada Petcharat, better known by the names Poyd, Nong Poy, or Treechada Malayaporn, is a Thai actress and model. Petcharat underwent gender affirming surgery at age 17.

Life and career 
Peranakan family born, as a boy, Petcharat realized she was a transgender woman. In front of her parents, however, she had to hide her identity and was forced to present as male. She felt disgusted by her genitals, so at the age of 17, she underwent gender affirming surgery. Since then, she has said that she feels as if she has been reborn.

At age 19, Petcharat won the Miss Tiffany's 2004 and Miss International Queen 2004.

Filmography
 With Love (2010)
 Spicy Beauty Queen of Bangkok 2 (2012)
 The White Storm (2013)
 From Vegas to Macau II (2015)
 Insomnia Lover (2016)
 Witch Doctor (2016)

References

External links 
 
 

1986 births
Treechada Petcharat
Living people
Treechada Petcharat
Treechada Petcharat
Treechada Petcharat
Treechada Petcharat
Treechada Petcharat
Transgender actresses
Transgender female models
Treechada Petcharat
Treechada Petcharat
Treechada Petcharat
Miss Tiffany's Universe
Miss International Queen winners